Peter Paternelli (born 10 March 1856, date of death unknown) was an Austrian sport shooter who competed in the 1912 Summer Olympics.

He was born in Strigno. In 1912 he was a member of the Austrian team which finished fourth in the team 100 metre running deer, single shots competition. In the 100 metre running deer, single shots event he finished 15th.

References

1856 births
Year of death missing
Austrian male sport shooters
Running target shooters
Olympic shooters of Austria
Shooters at the 1912 Summer Olympics